The Miss Rhode Island's Outstanding Teen competition is the pageant that selects the representative for the U.S. state of Rhode Island in the Miss America's Outstanding Teen pageant.

Gillian Johnston of Warwick was crowned Miss Rhode Island's Outstanding Teen on June 26, 2022 at the McVinney Auditorium in Providence, Rhode Island. She competed in the Miss America's Outstanding Teen 2023 pageant at the Hyatt Regency Dallas in Dallas, Texas on August 12, 2022 where she won the Spirit of America award.

Results summary
The year in parentheses indicates the year of the Miss America's Outstanding Teen competition the award/placement was garnered.

Placements
 Top 10: Ivy Shen (2012)
 Top 12: Macie Johnson (2019)
 Top 15: Selina Wang (2011), Heather Shen (2014)

Awards

Preliminary awards
 Preliminary Evening Wear/On-Stage Question: Heather Shen (2014), Macie Johnson (2019) (tie)
 Preliminary Talent: Emily Luther (2010), Ivy Shen (2012)

Non-finalist awards
 Non-finalist Evening Wear/On-Stage Question: Caroline Parente (2020)
 Non-finalist Talent: Emily Luther (2010)

Other awards
 America's Choice: Macie Johnson (2019)
 Outstanding Instrumental Talent: Ivy Shen (2012)
 Scholastic Excellence Award: Heather Shen (2014)
 Spirit of America Award: Gillian Johnston (2023)
 Top 5 Interview: Ivy Shen (2012), Alexandra Coppa (2013)

Winners

References

External links
 Official website

Rhode Island
Rhode Island culture
Women in Rhode Island
Annual events in Rhode Island